The 1992 Tour de France was the 79th edition of Tour de France, one of cycling's Grand Tours. The Tour began in San Sebastián in Spain with a prologue individual time trial on 4 July, and Stage 10 occurred on 14 July with a flat stage to Strasbourg. The race finished on the Champs-Élysées in Paris on 26 July.

Prologue
4 July 1992 — San Sebastián (Spain),  (ITT)

Stage 1
5 July 1992 — San Sebastián (Spain),

Stage 2
6 July 1992 — San Sebastián (Spain) to Pau,

Stage 3
7 July 1992 — Pau to Bordeaux,

Stage 4
8 July 1992 — Libourne,  (TTT)

Stage 5
9 July 1992 — Nogent-sur-Oise to Wasquehal,

Stage 6
10 July 1992 — Roubaix to Brussels (Belgium),

Stage 7
11 July 1992 — Brussels (Belgium) to Valkenburg (Netherlands),

Stage 8
12 July 1992 — Valkenburg (Netherlands) to Koblenz (Germany),

Stage 9
13 July 1992 — Luxembourg City (Luxembourg),  (ITT)

Stage 10
14 July 1992 — Luxembourg City (Luxembourg) to Strasbourg,

References

1992 Tour de France
Tour de France stages